In basketball, minutes of game time during which a player is on the court are recorded.  The minutes played statistics are recorded as far back as the 1951–52 season when statistics on minutes were first compiled by the National Basketball Association (NBA). Fifteen times the average leader has played fewer than 40 minutes per game and eight times the leader has played more than 46 minutes per game. Wilt Chamberlain has the seven highest leading totals, while Nate "Tiny" Archibald is the only other single-season leader to average over 46 minutes per game. In one season, Chamberlain averaged over 48 minutes per game (meaning that he rested fewer minutes during the season than he played in overtime during the season).

To qualify as minutes leader, the player must appear in at least 58 games (out of 82). However, a player who appears in fewer than 58 games may qualify as annual minutes leader if his minute total would have given him the greatest average, had he appeared in 58 games. This has been the requirement since the 2013–14 season.

Chamberlain led the league in minutes played per game nine times, followed by Allen Iverson (7) and Michael Finley (3) times. Twelve other players have led the league in minutes per game twice, eight of them in consecutive years. Chamberlain holds the record for consecutive titles with five, followed by Iverson with three (two times). Fifteen times a member of the San Francisco/Philadelphia/Golden State Warriors has led the league in average minutes. Nine full seasons and parts of another the average leader played for the Philadelphia 76ers. Seventeen seasons and parts of another the leader played for either the Philadelphia Warriors or the Philadelphia 76ers.

In 16 of the 61 seasons since the statistic has been kept, the minutes per game leader was not the total minutes played leader. Larry Bird and Iverson are the only multiple leaders in average who were surpassed in total minutes multiple times. Five of Iverson's seven times and both of Bird's times as the average leader they were surpassed in total minutes. Kevin Durant is the only player to lead the league in total minutes without finishing in the top three in average minutes during the same season. He is also the only player to never lead in average minutes, but lead in total minutes multiple times. The first four times and five of the first seven times that the leader in average did not lead in total minutes, he finished second in total minutes. However, the last six times that the average leader did not lead the league in total minutes, he was outside of the top 10 and the last nine times, he was outside of the top 5.

Key

Annual leaders

Multiple-time leaders

Notes

References
General

Specific

National Basketball Association lists
National Basketball Association statistical leaders